Mary Lynn Witherspoon (1950–2003) was a school teacher in Charleston, South Carolina, and died in 2003. Her ex-boyfriend's child, a trans woman now known as Katheryn Brown,  had stalked and obsessed over her for 22 years. Brown broke into her home after being released from prison then raped and killed her.

Early life 
Mary Lynn was born in 1950, and had a sister, Jackie Olsen, who was a few years older than her. She was a French teacher at Charlestowne Academy. She also taught kids that were staying in the local hospital, MUSC, during the school year. 

In 1981, Mary Lynn met Edmonds Tennent Brown III, who was an attorney. After a while, his son, Edmonds Tennent Brown IV (addressed as Brown), began growing obsessive and jealous of Mary Lynn.

Death 
On November 14, 2003 in the early morning, after 23 years of stalking Mary Lynn, Brown  broke into Mary Lynn's home as she was getting ready to leave for work. Brown pushed open the door, knocked her on the floor and dragged her upstairs to her bedroom where Brown raped her, strangled her, and left her in her bathtub where the police later found her.

Legacy 
In 2005, South Carolina introduced a law that was named after her, calling it "Mary Lynn's Law." and the V.I.N.E was said to have failed her, and companies such as those immediately updated their systems, including immediate notification to the victims when prisoners are released.

On April 14, 2013, The Crime and Investigation Network's Look Who's Stalking program televised an episode that documented Mary Lynn's story.

On April 12, 2016, Discovery ID's Obsession: Dark Desires aired an episode based on the tragic story of Mary Lynn. Mary Lynn was "interviewed" but later revealed to be an actress as the interviewee. It ended with a short monologue (speech) given by her sister of the days, weeks, months, after Mary Lynn's death.

References

Murder in South Carolina
2003 murders in the United States
Incidents of violence against women
2003 in South Carolina